The 1986 San Jose State Spartans football team represented San Jose State University during the 1986 NCAA Division I-A football season as a member of the Pacific Coast Athletic Association. The team was led by head coach Claude Gilbert, in his third year as head coach at San Jose State. They played home games at Spartan Stadium in San Jose, California. The Spartans finished the 1986 season as champions of the PCAA, with a record of ten wins and two losses (10–2, 7–0 PCAA).

As a result of the PCAA Championship, the Spartans qualified for a postseason bowl game against the Mid-American Conference (MAC) champion Miami Redskins. The 1986 California Bowl was played in Fresno, California on December 13, with San Jose State victorious, 37–7.

Schedule

Team players in the NFL
No San Jose State Spartans were selected in the 1987 NFL Draft.

The following finished their college career in 1986, were not drafted, but played in the NFL.

Notes

References

San Jose State
San Jose State Spartans football seasons
Big West Conference football champion seasons
San Jose State Spartans football